The Torno is an Italian river whose source is in Aspromonte National Park. From there, the river flows southeast and empties into the Ionian Sea north of  Brancaleone.

References

Drainage basins of the Ionian Sea
Rivers of the Province of Reggio Calabria
Rivers of Italy